The Noble M12 is a two-door, two-seat sports car manufactured by Noble Automotive.

Variants 
The coupe evolved through four versions of Noble cars, with the M400 as the ultimate version of the M12, and is followed by the M12 GTO-3R. Only 220 Noble GTO-3Rs and M400s were imported to the U.S.    The U.S. production rights to the M12s and M400s were sold in February 2007 to 1G Racing from Ohio. Due to high demand of these cars, 1G Racing (now Rossion Automotive) released its own improved car based on the M400, named Rossion Q1. Another company which is also producing a model developed from the M12 is Salica Cars 1 with their Salica GT and Salica GTR.

Performance 

Like the Noble M10, the Noble M12 is a two-door, two-seat model, originally planned both as a coupé and as a convertible. All M12s have been powered by modified bi-turbocharged Ford Duratec V6 engines. The M12 has a full steel roll cage, steel frame, and G.R.P. (fiberglass) composite clam shell body parts. Although looking to be track derived, the M12 is a street-legal vehicle, ready for both road and track. The M12 has no anti-roll bars, allowing for a comfortable feel.

The Noble M12 GTO-3R is equipped with Garrett T25 twin turbos. Acceleration from 0- in 3.7 seconds was published in the official brochure of the M12 GTO-3R, Road & Track indicated a 0- performance of 3.3 seconds, but subsequently listed it as 3.5 seconds.

The Noble M400 is equipped with Garrett T28 Twin-turbos.

The only convertible variant (the M12 GTC) was shown at motor shows but was canceled, and was never produced by Noble. In 2008, Salica Cars proposed the Salica GTC, offered both as a complete car and a conversion kit to transform an M12/400 coupe into a convertible.

References

External links 
 

M12
Sports cars
Cars introduced in 2000
Cars discontinued in 2008
Rear mid-engine, rear-wheel-drive vehicles